Incheon Grand Park is a park complex in Namdong-gu, Incheon, South Korea. Facilities at Incheon Grand Park include zoos and botanical gardens.

References

External links

Parks in Incheon
Namdong District